"Crystallize" is a song by Australian recording artist Kylie Minogue. It was written by Minogue, Dev Hynes and Scott Hoffman. The song was originally recorded for Minogue's 2014 album, Kiss Me Once, but did not make the final cut. "Crystallize" was released as a charity single for the fundraising campaign One Note For Cancer on 26 May 2014.

Chart performance
In the United Kingdom, "Crystallize" debuted and peaked at number 60 selling 3,278 copies, but fell out of the top 100 the following week. The song managed to chart within the top 40 in Flanders and Wallonia. In Spain, the song charted inside the top 50 at number 44. In Ireland and France, the song was less successful, charting at number 88 and 139 respectively.

Charts

Release history

References

2014 singles
2014 songs
Kylie Minogue songs
Parlophone singles
Songs written by Dev Hynes
Songs written by Kylie Minogue